The Maya Bridge at Yaxchilan was a suspension bridge believed to have been built by the Maya across the Usumacinta River,  Chiapas, Mexico. If so, it would have been the longest bridge discovered in the ancient world, dating from its construction by the Maya civilization in the late 7th century at Yaxchilan.  It was a suspension bridge with a more or less level deck.

Now an archaeological site, Yaxchilan had long been known to include an unusual raised terrace beside the river and pier in the river; these structures were long theorized to be the remains of a bridge.

The Maya City-State of Yaxchilan, founded in the 4th century, became one of the most powerful Mayan kingdoms during the Maya Classic Period. During the height of its power the kings of Yaxchilan built gleaming temples, pyramids, and luxurious palaces clustered along the grand plaza extending along the shores of the wild Usumacinta River. This broad river, now separating Mexico from Guatemala, formed a large U-shaped bend (or "oxbow") that encompassed the city of Yaxchilan. This natural barrier protected the city from invasion from outside forces. However, the river was in a high flood stage during the six month rainy season, during this time Yaxchilan became an island due to the swiftly flowing waters of the engorged river which encompassed the city. An all-weather passage across the treacherous river was a necessity in order to gain access to the farmlands to the north of the city.

To survive and operate efficiently as the seat of power, Yaxchilan required a dependable passageway to provide an uninterrupted flow of traffic across the river on a year-round basis.

It has been speculated that the Maya solved this urban transportation problem by constructing a 100-meter long suspension bridge across the wild river in the late 7th century. The bridge which featured three spans extended from a platform on the grand plaza of Yaxchilan crossing the river to the northern shore. The 63 meter center span remained the longest in the world until the construction of the Italian Trezzo sull'Adda Bridge in 1377. This would have required two piers in the river, The existence of this unique feat of engineering has been virtually reconstructed  by computer.
 
The ruins of the structure were investigated and  reconstruction was created using computer simulation, remote sensing, and archaeoengineering techniques by Engineer James A O'Kon PE. The results were presented to the archaeological and engineering world in the pages of National Geographic magazine in 1995.

References

 National Geographic magazine, October 1995.
 " Civil Engineering" Magazine, April 1995
 "Winds of Change" Magazine, Autumn 1997
 "Tech Topics" Georgia Tech Alumni Publication, Winter 1997
 "Famous Engineering Landmarks of the World" Berlow, Lawrence H. Phoenix,Arizona, ORYX Press 2000
 "Life in the Ancient Maya World" Fisher, Lynn, Oxford England, Oxford University press,2005
 "Ancient Maya" by Anita Ganeri
 " The Lost Secrets of Maya Technology" O'Kon, James, New York. Career Press, 2012

External links
Panoramio.com:  computer rendering of the bridge
Explorandomexico.com:  more information about Yaxchilan

Buildings and structures in Mesoamerica
Buildings and structures in Chiapas
History of Guatemala
Suspension bridges in Mexico
Maya architecture
Bridges in Guatemala
Yaxchilan